Danielle Robinson (born May 10, 1989) is an American professional basketball player for the Atlanta Dream of the Women's National Basketball Association (WNBA). She has previously played for the Indiana Fever, Minnesota Lynx, Phoenix Mercury, Las Vegas Aces, and San Antonio Stars in the WNBA.

College statistics
Source

USA Basketball
Robinson was named a member of the team representing the US at the 2009 World University Games held in Belgrade, Serbia. The team won all seven games to earn the gold medal. Robinson averaged 4.6 points per game.

Professional career

WNBA
Robinson was selected the first round of the 2011 WNBA Draft (6th overall) by the San Antonio Silver Stars.

Robinson quickly established herself as perhaps the quickest athlete in the WNBA. Robinson made the Western Conference All-Star Team in her third season in the league, and led the league in assists per game, earning the WNBA Peak Performer award for assists.

In 2015, Robinson re-signed with San Antonio in free agency.

In 2016, Robinson was sidelined for the whole season due to an achilles injury.

In 2017, Robinson was traded to the Phoenix Mercury in exchange for Isabelle Harrison and a 2017 first round pick.

On March 6, 2018, Robinson was traded along with a 2nd round pick in 2019, to the Minnesota Lynx, for the 12th pick in the 2018 WNBA draft.

After spending two seasons with the Indiana Fever, Robinson was traded on January 13, 2023, to the Atlanta Dream in exchange for the Kristy Wallace.

Europe

Robinson began her European career with Tarsus Belediye in Mersin, Turkey. She played for the team during the 2012–13 season in both the Turkish Women's Basketball League and the EuroLeague Women. The following year, she joined ZVVZ USK Prague. She came to the team late in the 2013–14 season, but helped them to the Final Eight in that year's EuroLeague Women. She returned to ZVVZ USK Prague for the 2014-15 season. She helped take the team to its first EuroLeague title, scoring 24 points on 11-of-19 shooting in the Final against the heavily favored UMMC Ekaterinburg.

WNBA career statistics

Regular season

|-
| style='text-align:left;'|2011
| style='text-align:left;'|San Antonio
| 34 || 9 || 23.1 || .460 || .000 || .903 || 2.3 || 3.9 || 0.8 || 0.1 || 1.8 || 8.2 
|-
| style='text-align:left;'|2012
| style='text-align:left;'|San Antonio
| 34 || 34 || 28.9 || .541 || .000 || .782 || 2.5 || 4.3 || 1.4 || 0.1 || 1.6 || 9.9
|-
| style='text-align:left;'|2013
| style='text-align:left;'|San Antonio
| 25 || 25 || 32.5 || .444 || .000 || .797 || 3.1 || 6.7 || 1.4 || 0.2 || 2.6 || 11.2
|-
| style='text-align:left;'|2014
| style='text-align:left;'|San Antonio
| 33 || 33 || 33.1 || .457 || .000 || .941 || 3.5 || 5.3 || 1.7 || 0.2 || 2.4 || 12.9
|-
| style='text-align:left;'|2015
| style='text-align:left;'|San Antonio
| 30 || 30 || 30.1 || .390 || .000 || .903 || 2.5 || 5.0 || 0.7 || 0.1 || 2.6 || 9.2
|-
| style='text-align:left;'|2017
| style='text-align:left;'|Phoenix
| 32 || 29 || 23.5 || .432 || .000 || .846 || 2.9 || 3.4 || 1.1 || 0.2 || 1.9 || 6.9
|-
| style='text-align:left;'|2018
| style='text-align:left;'|Minnesota
| 28 || 2 || 18.6 || .445 || .158 || .854 || 1.8 || 3.3 || 0.9 || 0.0 || 1.8 || 6.5
|-
| style='text-align:left;'|2019
| style='text-align:left;'|Minnesota
| 34 || 25 || 27.0 || .437 || .220 || .879 || 3.5 || 3.7 || 1.2 || 0.2 || 2.1 || 10.1
|-
| style='text-align:left;'|2020
| style='text-align:left;'|Las Vegas
| 22 || 1 || 22.4 || .512 || .385 || .810 || 2.4 || 3.2 || 0.9 || 0.1 || 1.3 || 7.4
|-
| style='text-align:left;'|2021
| style='text-align:left;'|Indiana
| 24 || 24 || 27.5 || .417 || .200 || .889 || 3.5 || 3.7 || 1.6 || 0.1 || 1.8 || 9.9
|-
| style='text-align:left;'|2022
| style='text-align:left;'|Indiana
| 31 || 30 || 23.6 || .419 || .225 || .850 || 2.9 || 3.8 || 0.7 || 0.2 || 1.6 || 7.4
|-
| style='text-align:left;'| Career
| style='text-align:left;'| 11 years, 4 teams
| 327 || 242 || 26.5 || .449 || .181 || .868 || 2.8 || 4.2 || 1.1 || 0.1 || 1.9 || 9.1

Postseason

|-
| style='text-align:left;'|2011
| style='text-align:left;'|San Antonio
| 3 || 3 || 30.0 || .259 || .000 || 1.000 || 3.0 || 2.3 || 1.7 || 0.0 || 2.0 || 5.3 
|-
| style='text-align:left;'|2012
| style='text-align:left;'|San Antonio
| 2 || 2 || 32.5 || .450 || .000 || 1.000 || 4.0 || 4.5 || 0.5 || 0.0 || 1.5 || 12.0
|-
| style='text-align:left;'|2014
| style='text-align:left;'|San Antonio
| 2 || 2 || 30.5 || .364 || .000 || .750 || 3.5 || 6.0 || 0.5 || 0.5 || 3.5 || 9.5
|-
| style='text-align:left;'|2017
| style='text-align:left;'|Phoenix
| 5 || 0 || 10.6 || .429 || .000 || 1.000 || 0.8 || 1.0 || 0.2 || 0.0 || 0.6 || 2.8
|-
| style='text-align:left;'|2019
| style='text-align:left;'|Minnesota
| 1 || 1 || 19.0 || .000 || .000 || .000 || 4.0 || 3.0 || 0.0 || 0.0 || 2.0 || 0.0
|-
| style='text-align:left;'|2020
| style='text-align:left;'|Las Vegas
| 8 || 7 || 29.9 || .397 || .333 || .727 || 4.4 || 3.9 || 1.3 || 0.0 || 1.5 || 9.1
|-
| style='text-align:left;'| Career
| style='text-align:left;'| 6 years, 3 teams
| 21 || 15 || 25.1 || .370 || .231 || .806 || 3.2 || 3.2 || 0.9 || 0.0 || 1.6 || 7.0

References

External links
Oklahoma Sooners bio 

1989 births
Living people
All-American college women's basketball players
American expatriate basketball people in the Czech Republic
American expatriate basketball people in Turkey
American women's basketball players
Basketball players from San Jose, California
Indiana Fever players
Las Vegas Aces players
LGBT basketball players
LGBT people from California
Lesbian sportswomen
Medalists at the 2009 Summer Universiade
Mersin Büyükşehir Belediyesi women's basketball players
Minnesota Lynx players
Oklahoma Sooners women's basketball players
Parade High School All-Americans (girls' basketball)
Phoenix Mercury players
Point guards
San Antonio Silver Stars draft picks
San Antonio Stars players
Universiade gold medalists for the United States
Universiade medalists in basketball
Women's National Basketball Association All-Stars